S104 may refer to :
 County Route S104, a county route in Bergen County, New Jersey
 HMS Sceptre (S104), a 1976 British Swiftsure-class submarine